Amuru Sugar Works Limited (ASWL) is a proposed sugar manufacturing company in the Northern Region of Uganda.

Location
The factory and sugar plantation would be located south of the Zoka Forest in Amuru District, Acholi sub-region.

Overview
Sometime before 2010, the Madhvani Group applied to lease  in Amuru District to establish a commercial sugar plantation and a factory. Uganda's central and district governments consented to the deal, but the resident communities, through their traditional leaders, objected. In September 2010, parliament members from the Acholi sub-region sued the Madhvani Group and the traditional chiefs over the "land giveaway". In 2012, the Madhvani Group won that case. The most contentious issues are "who owns the land?" and "who has the right to determine how that land can be used?"

New developments
On 13 January 2015, State House announced that the community had agreed to withdraw the court case and accept compensation for the land in contention.

An estimated 7,000 outgrowers are expected to benefit and the sugar estate and factory are expected to create an estimated 8,000 jobs. The entire project is budgeted at approximately US$100 million.

See also
Kakira Sugar Works

References

External links
Amuru sugar project will bring development to northern Uganda

Agriculture in Uganda
Amuru District
Northern Region, Uganda
Sugar companies of Uganda